Sir Charles Lawrence Somerset Clarke, 7th Baronet, OLY (born 12 March 1990) is a former professional 110 m hurdler who finished fourth in the London Olympic Games 110 m hurdles final. He is the son of Sir Toby Clarke, 6th Baronet and succeeded to the baronetcy on his father's death in 2019. He served as Captain of the Great Britain Athletics Team at the 2015 European Athletics Indoor Championships and was coached in Bath by Malcolm Arnold. He was coached in Paris by Giscard Samba Koundys for the 2016 Summer Olympics in Rio de Janeiro. He currently works for Citigroup in London. He is also a member of the American Roosevelt family.

Education
Born in Westminster, London, Clarke was educated at two independent schools: at Summer Fields School in the city of Oxford and Eton College in Berkshire. He went on to study Theology and Religious Studies at the University of Bristol, gaining a Second class honours, upper division (2:1).  He studied at the University of Bath for a master's degree in Management with a specialisation in UK Targeted Absolute Return Equity Fund Management.

Family
Clarke is the son of Sir Tobias Clarke, 6th Baronet. His sister is Theo Clarke, MP. Clarke's maternal grandfather was the Conservative MP Somerset de Chair. He takes his name Lawrence from his American ancestor Abbott Lawrence.

Junior athletics career
Clarke was in fourth place in the 110 m hurdles at the 2008 Commonwealth Youth Games in Pune, India. He was also the British University (BUCS) champion in the 60 m hurdles (2009) with a time of 7.83 seconds and 110 m Champion (2010) in a time of 13.85 seconds.

Clarke held the No. 1 spot on the British All Time list for the Under 20 men's 3"3 110 m Hurdles until 23 May 2010. He established a new National Junior Record with a personal best of 13.37 seconds whilst also winning gold at European Junior Athletics Championships in July 2009, in Novi Sad, Serbia.

Senior athletics career 
In June 2010, Clarke won the UK National Under-23 Title in a wind-assisted time (+2.5 m/s) of 13.60secs. He successfully defended this title in June 2011 in his season debut that year.

On 8 October 2010, Clarke won the bronze medal at the XIX Commonwealth Games in New Delhi. He finished third behind two other English hurdlers: Andy Turner (2010 European Champion) and William Sharman. It is the first time in history that England have completed a 1-2-3 clean sweep in the 110 m hurdles.

Clarke became national champion when he won the UK Senior 110 m hurdles title in 13.58s in July 2011, earning him a place on the UK team at the World Championships in Daegu.

He competed at the 2011 World Athletics Championships in Daegu, South Korea where he went out in the first round with a time of 13.65s (-0.2 m/s). The winner of his heat was Jason Richardson who went on to win the Championships after Dayron Robles, the 2008 Olympic Champion and World Record holder, was disqualified after the final.

2012 Summer Olympics

On 24 June 2012, he achieved selection for Great Britain in the 2012 Summer Olympics in London. He ran a new personal best of 13.31 (-0.5 m/s) in his Olympic Semi final on 8 August. As a result, he qualified as the only European for the 110 m Men's Hurdles Final as a fastest loser. Running from lane 2 in the final he finished an unexpected fourth place with a time of 13.39 seconds beating the 2009 World Champion, Ryan Brathwaite, into fifth.

Post London
He broke his wrist in the winter of 2012 followed by a series of hamstring tears that saw him miss high level competition in 2013. He returned to International competition in 2014 finishing eighth at the Glasgow Commonwealth Games. Two weeks later he competed at the European Athletics Championships in Zurich only to tear his hamstring five minutes before the call room for the European Final.

In March 2015 he was appointed Team Captain of Great Britain at the European Athletics Indoor Championships in Prague. He finished fifth in the 60 m hurdles. That summer he competed at the IAAF World Athletics Championships in the Bird's Nest Stadium in Beijing exiting in the semi-finals.

After the World Championships he made the decision to leave Malcolm Arnold (athletics coach) OBE and Bath and moved to Paris to train with Giscard Samba Koundys and Dimitri Bascou.

He competed at the IAAF World Indoor Championships in Portland, Oregon, U.S. in March 2016 just missing out on the Men's 60 m Hurdles final. His training partner Dimitri Bascou went on to win the bronze medal.

In July 2016 he was selected to represent Great Britain at the 2016 Summer Olympics in Rio de Janeiro, Brazil. He finished 11th, missing out on the final by 0.05 of a second.

In 2016 he joined Citigroup, before becoming managing director of Duration Capital Solutions in 2022.

Personal bests

International competitions

References

Living people
1990 births
Athletes from London
British male hurdlers
English male hurdlers
Olympic male hurdlers
Olympic athletes of Great Britain
Athletes (track and field) at the 2012 Summer Olympics
Athletes (track and field) at the 2016 Summer Olympics
Commonwealth Games bronze medallists for England
Commonwealth Games medallists in athletics
Athletes (track and field) at the 2010 Commonwealth Games
Athletes (track and field) at the 2014 Commonwealth Games
World Athletics Championships athletes for Great Britain
British Athletics Championships winners
Baronets in the Baronetage of the United Kingdom
Alumni of the University of Bristol
People educated at Eton College
English people of American descent
English people of Dutch descent
Roosevelt family
Schuyler family
Clarke baronets
Medallists at the 2010 Commonwealth Games